This is a list of electoral results for the Electoral district of Mount Burges in Western Australian state elections.

Members for Mount Burges

Election results

Elections in the 1900s

 J. (Joseph?) Thompson withdrew from the race after the close of nominations, and his name consequently remained on the ballot paper.

References

Western Australian state electoral results by district